Radoslav Terziev (born 6 August 1994) is a Bulgarian professional footballer who plays as a defender for Krumovgrad.

Career

Early career
Born in Plovdiv, Terziev began his career at the Spartak Plovdiv academy but moved to Botev Plovdiv along with Lazar Marin, Lachezar Angelov and Rosen Andonov in January 2012. He then spent one and a half seasons on loan at second-tier Rakovski. He scored his first goal in senior football in a 3–0 win over Akademik Svishtov on 10 November 2013. Terziev totalled 39 appearances in all competitions for Rakovski.

Botev Plovdiv
After returning from his loan spell, Terziev made his Botev debut on 3 July 2014, in a 4–0 win over Libertas in the first leg of the first qualifying round of the UEFA Europa League. He played full 90 minutes. Terziev made his A Group debut in a 1–0 home win against Lokomotiv Sofia on 20 July, appearing as a 69th-minute substitute for Milen Gamakov. One month later he made his first league start in a game against Slavia Sofia.

During the second half of season 2015–16, Terziev became a regular central defender in the starting lineup of Botev Plovdiv.

On 22 October 2016, Terziev scored a goal after an assistance from Todor Nedelev during the 2–3 home defeat from Cherno More Varna. 

On 24 May 2017, Terziev played an important role in the historical 2–1 win over Ludogorets Razgrad in the Bulgarian Cup final and won the cup with Botev Plovdiv.

On 16 June 2017, he signed a new two-year contract.

International career

Under 21
As one of the most promising defenders Terziev has received call-ups for the Bulgarian U19 and U21 national football teams. On 31 March 2015, he participated in the 1–3 away defeat of Bulgaria U21 from Wales U21. On 9 June 2015, Terziev played 90 minutes during the 1–0 win in a friendly game with Cyprus U21.

In September 2015, Terziev was again included in the squad during the 0–2 away victory over Romania U21 and the 3–0 home win over Luxembourg U21. He played 90 minutes in both games.

On 9 October 2015, Terziev played 90 minutes during the 2–0 win over Armenia U21. Five days later, on 14 October, Terziev was again in the starting lineup but this time he and his teammates were defeated with 0–1 by Denmark U21.

On 25 March 2016, Terziev was in the starting lineup for the goal-less draw with Wales U21.

On 21 May 2016, Terziev was in the starting lineup during the 0–1 defeat from France U21.

Senior
In late January 2015, Terziev received his first call-up to the full national side by new manager Ivaylo Petev for a friendly match against Romania but he remained an unused substitute in this game. He was also part of Petar Houbchev's preliminary list for a November 2016 World Cup qualifier against Belarus, but did not make the final squad for the match.

Career statistics

Club

Honours
Botev Plovdiv
Bulgarian Cup: 2016–17
Bulgarian Supercup: 2017

References

External links
 Profile at football.com
 
 

1994 births
Living people
Bulgarian footballers
Association football defenders
FC Spartak Plovdiv players
Botev Plovdiv players
PFC Slavia Sofia players
FC Krumovgrad players
First Professional Football League (Bulgaria) players